The Ahmedabad–Varanasi Weekly Express is an Superfast Express train belonging to Western Railway zone that runs between  and  in India. It is currently being operated with 19407/19408 train numbers on a weekly basis.

Service

It averages speed of 52 km/hr as 19407/Ahmedabad–Varanasi Weekly Express and covers  1704 km in 32h 40m & with averages speed of 53 km/hr as 19408/Varanasi–Ahmedabad Weekly Express and covers  1704 km in 32h 20m.

Schedule

Route and halts 

The important halts of the train are :

 
 
 
 
 
 
 
 
 
 
 
 
 
 Old

Coach composition

The train has standard LHB rakes with max speed of 110 kmph. The train consists of 17 coaches:

 1 AC II Tier
 2 AC III Tier
 7 Sleeper coaches
 5 General Unreserved
 2 Seating cum Luggage Rake

Traction

Both trains are hauled by a Vatva Loco Shed- based WDM-3A or WDM-3 diesel locomotive from Ahmedabad to Varanasi and vice versa.

Rake sharing

The train shares its rake with 19401/19402 Ahmedabad–Lucknow Weekly Express.

See also 

 Ahmedabad Junction railway station
 Varanasi Junction railway station
 Ahmedabad–Patna Weekly Express
 Ahmedabad–Lucknow Weekly Express
 Dwarka Express
 Sabarmati Express

References

Notes

External links 

19407/Ahmedabad - Varanasi Weekly Express India Rail Info
19408/Varanasi - Ahmedabad Weekly Express India Rail Info

Rail transport in Gujarat
Rail transport in Madhya Pradesh
Transport in Ahmedabad
Passenger trains originating from Varanasi
Express trains in India
Railway services introduced in 2012